Foremost Group is a privately held American shipping company, headquartered in New York City. It operates globally, chartering vessels to companies in the dry bulk shipping industry. Its clients include Bunge (St. Louis, MO), Cargill (Minnetonka, MN), Dreyfus (Rotterdam), MOL (Tokyo) and NYK Line (Tokyo). Foremost Group was founded in 1964 by James Si-Cheng Chao and his wife Ruth Mulan Chu Chao, who each immigrated to the United States from China by way of Taiwan. Its chair and CEO since 2008 is Angela Chao, the sixth daughter of the company's founders and the third of their children born in the United States.

Commercial operations 
Seventy two percent of the freight its ships carry on behalf of its charterers is shipped to China, with its ships operating primarily in the region of Korea to Australia, but also world-wide. Iron ore, bauxite, and other bulk dry goods are the principal cargoes carried by its charterers, who choose the routes and cargoes carried.

Customers have been reported to include Japan's NYK Line and MOL, Dreyfus of France, and both Bunge and Cargill of the United States.

Humanitarian shipments 
Early in its history, Foremost shipped rice to Vietnam under contract with the U.S. government during the Vietnam War. The United Nations contracted with Foremost to deliver humanitarian cargo to Bangladesh during its war for independence in 1971.

Fleet 
SUNY Maritime College called its fleet “one of the youngest and most environmentally friendly fleets in the world.” In 2015 it began construction of the first cargo ship jointly financed by banks in both the People's Republic of China and Taiwan; the Beijing office of China's Export Import Bank and the New York branch of Taiwan's First Commercial Bank each provided equal loan facilities to support construction of two 180,000-dwt bulk carriers. Its ships are registered under the flags of Liberia and Hong Kong. Foremost has had some of its ships built by China State Shipbuilding, some of them financed by loans from the state-owned Export-Import Bank of China.  

From 2012 to 2019 its fleet grew from 17 to 33 ships, valued at $1.2 billion, the most valuable of any dry bulk shipper headquartered in the United States. It ordered the construction of 10 bulk cargo vessels in 2017 and 2018, the majority from Japanese shipyards.

In 2019, Foremost received an "eco-friendly" post-Panamax bulk carrier built by Japanese Oshima Shipyards in Nagasaki Prefecture and financed by the First Commercial Bank of Taiwan.

In 2022, Foremost ordered two additional "eco-friendly" 185,000-dwt capesize bulk carriers from Japan’s Namura Shipbuilding capable of carrying multiple bulk cargoes such as iron ore and bauxite. The ships are anticipated to comply with EEDI “phase III” requirements for reduced emissions and increased efficiency. Some sources report the vessels will initially serve Foremost’s long-term contract with Japanese shipper NYK Line.

Controversies
Based in part on Foremost's Pacific-Rim trade, President Trump referred to James Chao's daughter, Elaine Chao, using a racist slur and labelled the Taiwan-born U.S. citizen as a "China lover." The slur was immediately condemned by political and community leaders and civil rights groups including the CEO of the Anti-Defamation League.

The company has come under scrutiny due to perceived conflicts of interest involving Elaine Chao – daughter of its founders and sister of its current CEO – and her husband then-Senate Majority Leader Mitch McConnell. Additional attention has related to Elaine Chao's role as Secretary of Transportation – which regulated U.S.-registered cargo vessels – during the administration of President Donald Trump.

References

Shipping companies of the United States
Transport companies established in 1964